Prenesta rubralis is a moth in the family Crambidae described by George Hampson in 1898. It is found in Peru and Ecuador.

The wingspan is about 34 mm. Adults are dark red, the forewings with traces of an antemedial line preceded by a yellowish mark in the cell. There is a distinct black-edged orange quadrate spot in the end of the cell, as well as a discoidal black lunule. The postmedial line has an orange spot on the outer side. The hindwings have a discoidal annulate spot and a curved fuscous postmedial line. Both wings have a terminal series of black points.

References

Moths described in 1967
Spilomelinae